Peter Polansky and Neal Skupski were the defending champions but chose not to defend their title.

Luke Bambridge and Akira Santillan won the title after defeating Enrique López Pérez and Jeevan Nedunchezhiyan 6–2, 6–2 in the final.

Seeds

Draw

References
 Main Draw
 Qualifying Draw

Savannah Challenger - Doubles
2018 Doubles